Great Comp Garden is a Georgian farmhouse and garden, located on Comp Lane near the hamlet of Comp in Kent, England. It was developed by Roderick and Joyce Cameron in the 1950s, and features an Italian garden. It opened to the public in 1968, and now holds regular garden festivals and outdoor theatre productions.

History

Great Comp Garden is the creation of the late Roderick and Joyce Cameron (formerly Joyce Trafford Riggall), after they moved to the 17th Century Manor in 1957 (which has been Grade II* listed since 1952), with the idea of developing the garden into a plantsman’s delight. The house was once a farmhouse, the stables has been converted into the Old Dairy Tearooms.

They originally started with 4.5 acres, and in 1962 and 1975 added more land to the garden. They created an Italian Garden, explorable 'ruins' and 'temple' (all hand built by Roderick), using sand and stone from the garden. The ruins and statuary (including Pope's Urn and Longleat Urn), add interesting focal points to the densely planted garden.

The garden has very good displays of magnolias (they have over 30 varieties of this shrub),Azaleas, salvias, crocosmias, dahlias and other exotic plants in the region. They have planted up to 380 shrubs and trees in the garden.

The garden first opened up to the public in 1968. It had an entrance fee of 10p and had around 200 visitors on the opening days. The garden then opened for the National Garden Scheme, which it still opens on certain days for.

In 1980, Roderick was elected to the RHS Council. Which he greatly enjoyed, despite the numerous disagreements with various RHS members.

The storms of 1987 and 1990 caused major damage to the garden. But Roderick and Joyce turned this tragedy into a positive by planting more plants.

When his wife died in 1992, Roderick set up the Great Comp Charitable Trust to keep the garden open and running. He stayed in the house until he was 90 and then moved to a local residential home but died after a short illness. 286118

After Roderick died, the trust sold several items from inside the house including a George III sycamore tea caddy and ivory and horn-veneered miniature chess table.

William Dyson then took over management of the gardens in 2000, as a curator. He previously had managed a Salvia Nursery within the garden, for twenty years. As well as exhibiting at the Chelsea Flower Show.

Great Comp has four annual special events including a Spring Plant Fair, Summer outdoor theatre and an Autumn Plant Fair\garden festival.
 
The Coull Quartet have regularly played in the garden during summer classical music festivals. They played on September 5, 12 and 18 in 2010 (after the death of Roderick Cameron).

The gardens regular hold garden festivals. In 2013, they had the 11th Garden Festival.

The garden also is a venue for outdoor theatre productions, such as William Shakespear's The Comedy of Errors, starring Jake Hendriks in 2011.
Then in 2012, As You Like It.

References

List of tourist attractions in Kent

External links
 Great Comp Garden

Gardens in Kent